Yuexiu Park Station is a station on Line 2 of the Guangzhou Metro that started operations on 29December 2002. It is located under Yuexiu Park at the intersection of North Jiefang Road and Liuhua Road.

Nearby places 
 China Hotel
 Chinese Export and Import Commodities Fair (Liuhua) Complex, former home to the Canton Fair
 Dongfang Hotel
 Lanbu (Orchid Park)
 Museum of the Mausoleum of the Nanyue King
 Yuexiu Mountain (Yuexiu Park)

References

Railway stations in China opened in 2002
Guangzhou Metro stations in Yuexiu District